Asia League may refer to:

Asia League Ice Hockey
Asia League (basketball)

See also
AFC Champions League